Estola lata is a species of beetle in the family Cerambycidae. It was described by Ernst Fuchs in 1974. It is known from Brazil.

References

Estola
Beetles described in 1974